Jerry L. Fielding (born 1947) is an American politician. He serves as a Republican member of the Alabama Senate for the 11th district, encompassing Calhoun, Coosa, Elmore and Talladega Counties.

Biography

Early life
Jerry L. Fielding was born on May 9, 1947, in Richville, Coosa County, Alabama. He graduated from Auburn University in Auburn, Alabama and received a J.D. from the Thomas Goode Jones School of Law of Faulkner University in Montgomery, Alabama.

Career
He served as a district judge. Since November 2, 2010, he has served as a Republican state senator. In December 2013, he suggested proposing a resolution in the state legislature to support Duck Dynasty's patriarch Phil Robertson, who had gotten worldwide attention for his comments in a December 2013 interview that were seen as homophobic and racist.

Personal life
He is a Methodist.

References

1947 births
Living people
People from Coosa County, Alabama
Auburn University alumni
Republican Party Alabama state senators